Mary Almera Parsons (May 2, 1850 – January 12, 1944) was an American physician who successfully petitioned for the Medical Society of the District of Columbia to grant medical licenses to women.

Biography
In 1870, Parsons entered medical school at Howard University in Washington, D.C. In June 1874, she graduated from Howard University and applied for her licence to practice, along with fellow graduate Mary Spackman, both of whom were rejected because they were women. 

Flodoardo Howard, the president of the Medical Society of the District of Columbia, was pressured in to forming a committee to discuss the issue of awarding women licences to practice medicine. Samuel Claggett Busey was invited to be in the committee but declined, as he knew the majority of the members were opposed to women practicing medicine. Busey would go on to become the president of the Medical Society of the District of Columbia and he was a supporter of Mary Almera Parsons' application. J. Ford Thompson encouraged Parsons to appeal to the Federal Government to amend the charter and allow women to obtain licences to practice medicine. On January 14, 1875 she petitioned Congress to amend the society's charter, and on the March 3, 1875 the bill was approved. Despite this, the Medical Society and Medical Association both refused her membership for the following three years, which prevented her from obtaining consultation privileges, and so denied her equality with male doctors. During this period the support for female doctors was growing, and several state and local medical societies began accepting female members and awarding them consultation privileges in 1878. Parsons' application to the medical society was approved in October 1888.  In 1901, Parsons became the first female vice-president of the Medical Society, and in 1915, the vice-president of the Association of Southern Medical Women.

References 

1850 births
1944 deaths
Place of birth missing
Howard University College of Medicine alumni
Place of death missing
19th-century American physicians
19th-century American women physicians
20th-century American physicians
20th-century American women physicians
American women's rights activists